Sidebotham is an English surname. Notable people with this surname include:

 Joseph Watson Sidebotham (1857–1925), British colliery owner and politician
 Robin Sidebotham, British rock musician, known professionally as Robin George
 Stephen Sidebotham (born 1935), English priest, Dean of Hong Kong

See also
Sidebottom